McEachern and MacEachern are Irish and Scottish surnames. The names are Anglicised forms of the Gaelic Mac Eichthigheirn, meaning "son of Eichthighearn". The personal name Eichthighearn is composed of two elements. The first is each, meaning "horse"; the second is tighearna, meaning "lord". The surnames MacEachern and McEachern can be represented in Scottish Gaelic by MacEachairn, and MacEacharna.

People with the surnames
McEachern
 Alex McEachern, (born 1939) Canadian politician in Alberta
 Allan McEachern (1926–2008) Canadian lawyer and judge
 Chase McEachern, Canadian campaigner for mandatory heart defibrillators
 Lon McEachern, American poker analyst
 Malcolm McEachern (1883–1945), Australian bass singer
 Murray McEachern (1915–1982), Canadian jazz trombonist and alto saxophonist
 Robert O. McEachern (1927-2008), American teacher and politician
 Shawn McEachern (born 1969), American ice hockey player and coach

MacEachern
 David MacEachern (born 1967), Canadian bobsledder
 Jared MacEachern (born 1980) American heavy metal musician
 Mackenzie MacEachern (born 1994), American ice hockey player
 Shane MacEachern (born 1967), Canadian ice hockey player
 Scott MacEachern (born 1960), Canadian anthropologist

See also
 McEachern High School, a high school in Powder Springs, Georgia.
 McEachen (surname)
 McEacharn

References

Anglicised Scottish Gaelic-language surnames
Patronymic surnames